Odo I (1060 – 1102 at Tarsus), also known as Eudes, surnamed Borel and called the Red, was duke of Burgundy between 1079 and 1102. Odo was the second son of Henry of Burgundy and grandson of Robert I. He became the duke following the abdication of his older brother, Hugh I, who retired to become a Benedictine monk at Cluny.

He participated in the French expedition to the Iberian peninsula, started after the Battle of Sagrajas and ending with little accomplished in the failed Siege of Tudela in 1087. Later, he participated in the Crusade of 1101, where he died, while in Asia Minor, in 1101.

In a charter from his expedition to the Iberian peninsula, he admitted he had withheld property belonging to the abbey of Saint-Philibert de Tournus, an abbey patronized by his aunt Constance, wife of Alfonso VI of León and Castile. In 1101, when leaving on crusade, he made a gift and a will in favor of the abbey of Molesme. Also when leaving on crusade, he signed a charter of renunciation at St. Beningne de Dijon and another at the priory of Gevrey-Chambertin.

An incident is reported of Odo by an eyewitness, Eadmer, biographer of Anselm of Canterbury. While Saint Anselm was progressing through Odo's territory on his way to Rome in 1097, the bandit, expecting great treasure in the archbishop's retinue, prepared to ambush and loot it.  Coming upon the prelate's train, the duke asked for the archbishop, whom they had not found.  Anselm promptly came forward and took the duke by surprise, saying "My lord duke, suffer me to embrace thee."  The flabbergasted duke immediately allowed the bishop to embrace him and offered himself as Anselm's humble servant.

Family

Odo married Sibylla of Burgundy (1065–1101), daughter of William I, Count of Burgundy, and became the father of:
Helie of Burgundy 1080–1141, wife of Bertrand of Toulouse and William III of Ponthieu
Florine of Burgundy 1083–1097, wife of Sweyn the Crusader, prince of Denmark
Hugh II of Burgundy 1084–1143
Henry 1087–1125, a priest

Ancestry

References

Gwatkin, H.M., Whitney, J.P. (ed) The Cambridge Medieval History: Volume II—The Rise of the Saracens and the Foundations of the Western Empire. Cambridge University Press, 1926.

House of Burgundy
Dukes of Burgundy
Christians of the Crusade of 1101
1060 births
1103 deaths